Asimaki is a surname. Notable people with the surname include:

Alexandra Asimaki (born 1988), Greek water polo player
Asimakis Fotilas (1761–1835), Greek politician and revolutionary leader